The Erdős–Turán conjecture is an old unsolved problem in additive number theory (not to be confused with Erdős conjecture on arithmetic progressions) posed by Paul Erdős and Pál Turán in 1941. 

For example, the natural numbers are themselves an additive basis of order 1, since every natural number is trivially a sum of at most one natural number. Lagrange's four-square theorem says that the set of positive square numbers is an additive basis of order 4. Another highly non-trivial and celebrated result along these lines is Vinogradov's theorem. 

One is naturally inclined to ask whether these results are optimal. It turns out that Lagrange's four-square theorem cannot be improved, as there are infinitely many positive integers which are not the sum of three squares. This is because no positive integer which is the sum of three squares can leave a remainder of 7 when divided by 8. One can then estimate the expected value, which in this case will be quite large. Therefore, one should expect that the squares are quite inefficient at representing positive integers as the sum of four elements, since there should already be lots of representations as sums of three elements for those positive integers  that passed the arithmetic obstruction. Examining Vinogradov's theorem quickly reveals that the primes are also very inefficient at representing positive integers as the sum of four primes, for instance. 

How efficient can it be?

This is basically the question that Paul Erdős and Pál Turán asked in 1941.

History

The conjecture was made jointly by Paul Erdős  and Pál Turán in 1941. In the original paper, they write

where  denotes the limit superior. If  is always positive for sufficiently large , then  is called an additive basis (of order 2). This problem has attracted significant attention but remains unsolved.

In 1964, Erdős published a multiplicative version of this conjecture.

Progress

While the conjecture remains unsolved, there have been some advances on the problem. First, we express the problem in modern language. For a given subset , we define its representation function . Then the conjecture states that if  for all  sufficiently large, then .

We say that  is an additive basis of order  if  for all  sufficiently large. One can see from an elementary argument that if  is an additive basis of order , then

So we obtain the lower bound .

The original conjecture spawned as Erdős and Turán sought a partial answer to Sidon's problem (see: Sidon sequence). Later, Erdős set out to answer the following question posed by Sidon: how close to the lower bound  can an additive basis  of order  get? This question was answered in the case  by Erdős in 1956. Erdős proved that there exists an additive basis  of order 2 and constants  such that  for all  sufficiently large. In particular, this implies that there exists an additive basis  such that , which is essentially best possible. This motivated Erdős to make the following conjecture:

If  is an additive basis of order , then 

In 1986, Eduard Wirsing proved that a large class of additive bases, including the prime numbers, contains a subset that is an additive basis but significantly thinner than the original. In 1990, Erdős and Prasad V. Tetali extended Erdős's 1956 result to bases of arbitrary order. In 2000, V. Vu proved that thin subbases exist in the Waring bases using the Hardy–Littlewood circle method and his polynomial concentration results. In 2006, Borwein, Choi, and Chu proved that for all additive bases ,  eventually exceeds 7.

References

Additive number theory
Conjectures
Unsolved problems in number theory